Yeni Mosque, Jeni Mosque or New Mosque (from , French spelling: Yéni-Djami) can refer to:

 New Mosque (Istanbul), Turkey
 New Mosque, Malatya, Turkey
 Jeni Mosque, Bitola, Republic of Macedonia
 Yeni Mosque, Komotini, Greece
 Yeni Mosque, Larissa, Greece
 Yeni Mosque, Mytilene, Greece
 Yeni Mosque, Thessaloniki, Greece
 Yeni Jami, Nicosia, Cyprus